Jane and the Lost City is a 1987 UK film, based on the British newspaper strip Jane by Norman Pett.  An adventure comedy set during World War II, the film was directed by Terry Marcel, and stars Kirsten Hughes in the title role, Sam Jones, Maud Adams, Jasper Carrott and Robin Bailey.

Synopsis 
British Prime Minister Winston Churchill sends Jane (Hughes) and the Colonel (Bailey) on a mission to prevent the diamonds of the fabled Lost City from falling into enemy hands.  Journeying to Africa where they are joined by Jungle Jack Buck (Jones), their quest is dogged by Nazi agents Lola Pagola and Heinrich (Adams and Carrott).

Jane and the Lost City emulates the mild eroticism of its source material, having the heroine lose items of her clothing several times during the narrative. Despite this, the film was released as PG (Parental Guidance) in the USA.

Cast 
Sam J. Jones – ‘Jungle’ Jack Buck
Maud Adams – Lola Pagola
Jasper Carrott – Heinrich / Herman / Hans
Kirsten Hughes – Jane
Graham Stark – Tombs
Robin Bailey – The Colonel
Ian Roberts – Carl
Elsa O'Toole – The Leopard Queen
John Rapley – Dr. Schell
Charles Comyn – Paddy
Ian Steadman – Capt. Fawcett
Graham Armitage – Gen. Smythe-Paget
Richard Huggett – Winston Churchill
Andrew Buckland – Grenville
Albert Raphael – Rashleigh
James White – Scott
Victor Gallucci – Muller
Patrick Hugnin – German Pilot
John Alton – Freddy
Magnum – Fritz the dog
Dharmarajen Sabapathee - Indian chief

Production notes 
Location filming took place in Mauritius.

Releases 
The film was released on DVD in 2001 by Anchor Bay.

References

External links 

 

1987 films
1980s adventure comedy films
British adventure comedy films
Films based on British comics
Films based on comic strips
Films directed by Terry Marcel
Films set in Africa
Live-action films based on comics
British World War II films
Films shot in Mauritius
Cultural depictions of Winston Churchill
1987 comedy films
1980s English-language films
1980s British films